The Abeille Flandre was an ocean tug, in service with the French Navy from December 1979 until 2022. She is the property of the French private company Abeilles International.

She was based at Toulon on the Mediterranean coast. Before she was replaced by Abeille Bourbon, she was based at Brest, where she assisted maritime traffic off the coast of Brittany. She was replaced on this station in April 2005 by the more powerful, 80-metre Abeille Bourbon.

French rescue tugs on government contracts operate under the authority of a préfet maritime. If a salvage is successful, the French state earns half the value of the salvaged cargo. When the vessel is not required for government service, its operator can request the préfet to release it to perform private salvage and rescue missions. Rates for private salvages are negotiated on a case-by-case basis. Fees are never charged to rescue people.

Following her salvage role in the sinkings of the Erika and the Ievoli Sun, the Abeille Flandre gained recognition and public popularity in France. Hervé Hamon's book L'Abeille d'Ouessant is a homage to the ship.

The Abeille Flandre livery includes the angled blue-white-red stripes of a French ship in public service. She was featured in the Discovery Channel documentary Wild and Angry Seas, released in August 2003.

External links 

  Abeille Flandre at Netmarine.net
  Abeille Flandre arrives in Brest to be dismantled at Le Télégramme

Auxiliary ships of France
Tugboats of France
1978 ships